The Western Eyre Football League (WEFL), formerly Far West Football League (FWFL), is an Australian rules football competition based in the Ceduna area of the Eyre Peninsula region of South Australia, Australia.  As of March 2021, the league includes clubs in Ceduna, Thevenard, Koonibba Aboriginal community, Penong (Western United FC), Streaky Bay (West Coast Hawks) and Wirrulla. 

It is an affiliated member of the South Australian National Football League.

Brief history
The County Of Way Football Association was formed in 1909, with founding clubs including Charra, Denial Bay, Goode, Koonibba, Murat and Penong. Fowlers Bay also wished to join the league but was denied entry due to excessive travel distance.

In 1948 The league changed its name to Murat Bay Football League changed and then Far West Football League in 1962.

The Koonibba Roosters are the oldest continuing Aboriginal football club in Australia, having named their Team of the Century in 2009.

The West Coast Hawks of Streaky Bay and Wirrulla club joined the league in March 2021, after the Mid West Football League was wound up permanently. Around the same time, the Far West Football League changed its name to the Western Eyre Football League.

Current Clubs

Premiers
List of Premiership teams of the Western Eyre Football League.

1909 Murat Bay
1910 Koonibba
1911 Murat Bay
1912 Murat Bay
1913 Murat Bay
1914 Murat Bay
1915-1921 Recess
1922 Koonibba
1923 Athenna
1924 Murat Bay
1925 Koonibba
1926 Koonibba
1927 Koonibba
1928 Koonibba
1929 Murat Bay
1930 No Competition
1931 Murat Bay
1932 Murat Bay
1933 Ceduna
1934 Ceduna
1935-1936 Recess 
1937 Bookabie
1938 Ceduna
1939 Goode
1940 United 
1941-1945 Recess due to WW2
1946 Ceduna
1947 Koonibba
1948 Koonibba
1949 Koonibba
1950 Ceduna

1951 Koonibba
1952 Ceduna
1953 Ceduna
1954 Koonibba
1955 Ceduna
1956 Koonibba
1957 Koonibba
1958 Rovers
1959 Thevenard
1960 Koonibba
1961 Koonibba
1962 Penong 
1963 Koonibba
1964 Charra
1965 Ceduna
1966 Penong 
1967 Thevenard
1968 Thevenard
1969 Thevenard
1970 Thevenard
1971 Thevenard
1972 Thevenard
1973 Thevenard
1974 Thevenard
1975 Koonibba
1976 Thevenard
1977 Koonibba
1978 Thevenard
1979 Koonibba
1980 Western United
1981 Thevenard

1982 Koonibba
1983 Thevenard
1984 Thevenard
1985 Thevenard
1986 Thevenard
1987 Thevenard
1988 Koonibba
1989 Thevenard
1990 Koonibba
1991 Thevenard
1992 Thevenard
1993 Thevenard
1994 Koonibba
1995 Koonibba
1996 Koonibba
1997 Blues
1998 Koonibba
1999 Blues
2000 Western United 
2001 Koonibba
2002 Koonibba
2003 Western United
2004 Western United
2005 Western United
2006 Western United
2007 Western United
2008 Western United
2009 Blues
2010 Koonibba
2011 Koonibba
2012 Koonibba

2013 Thevenard
2014 Koonibba
2015 Thevenard
2016 Blues
2017 Koonibba
2018 Western United
2019 Western United
2020 Recess due to COVID-19
2021 West Coast Hawks
2022 Blues

Ladders

2011 Ladder

2012 Ladder

2013 Ladder

References

Further reading
 Country Footy
 Encyclopedia of South Australian country football clubs, compiled by Peter Lines. 
 South Australian country football digest, by Peter Lines 

Eyre Peninsula
Australian rules football competitions in South Australia